Brighter Now is a 1982 album by The Legendary Pink Dots. The album was rereleased in 2008. Ned Raggett off Allmusic noted that "the sound is certainly among the roughest and sparest of any LPD release, and in many ways is a tentative effort that is more a product of its time than anything else." It was released as a cassette before its official LP release in 1982. In Phaze's initial cassette release was limited to 300 copies, with two different covers. The Art Nouveau edition is limited to 60 copies, and is a split release with the LPD's on one side and Portion Control's Gaining Momentum LP on the other. The In Phaze LP edition is limited to 1,000 copies, while their cassette version is a promo featuring an LPD textual discography, as well as a short story by Edward. All Terminal Kaleidoscope/PIAS editions have a slightly different cover from the original, while the Soleilmoon edition features new cover artwork and a lyric booklet.

Track listing 

(*) Tracks included on later releases; not included on initial cassette releases.

Personnel 
 Edward Ka-Spel – vocals
 M 019 (Michael Marshall) – keyboards, guitar
 Phil Harmonix (Phil Knight) – tapes
 Rolls Another One (Roland Calloway) – bass
 Rik Chevrolet – guitar
 Keith Thompson – drums
 May B. Irma Mazed (April White) – keyboards

Notes 

1982 albums
The Legendary Pink Dots albums